Josefa Masegosa Gallego is a Spanish astronomer and scientific researcher. She is a winner of both the Granada, City of Science and Innovation award and the Mariana Pineda Award of Equality.

Life 
Gallego was born in 1957 in Oria, Spain. She has a PhD from the University of Granada.

Gallego works in the field of astrophysics. She researches science at the Spanish National Research Council at the Institute of Astrophysics of Andalusia.  Her research is mainly focused on formation in intense stars and evolution, formation and nuclear activity in galaxies.

In 2018, she won the Granada, City of Science and Innovation award, and in 2022, she won the Mariana Pineda Award of Equality.

References 

Spanish astronomers

Women astronomers
1957 births

Living people
People from Almería
University of Granada alumni
21st-century Spanish women scientists